Val Yacula (1908 – September 24, 1958) was a Canadian politician. He represented the electoral district of Springfield in the House of Commons of Canada as a member of the Progressive Conservatives.

He was elected in the 1958 election. However, he died on September 24, 1958, after just 178 days in office.

External links
 

1908 births
1958 deaths
Members of the House of Commons of Canada from Manitoba
Progressive Conservative Party of Canada MPs
Ukrainian emigrants to Canada